The Producers Guild of America Award for Outstanding Children's Program is an annual award given by the Producers Guild of America since 2011.

Winners and nominees

2010s

2020s

Programs with multiple awards
11 awards
 Sesame Street (10 consecutive)

Programs with multiple nominations

12 nominations
 Sesame Street

4 nominations
 SpongeBob SquarePants

3 nominations
 Dora the Explorer
 iCarly
 Phineas and Ferb
 Teenage Mutant Ninja Turtles

2 nominations
 Animaniacs
 A Series of Unfortunate Events
 Carmen Sandiego
 Doc McStuffins
 Green Eggs and Ham
 Octonauts
 School of Rock

References

Children's Program